Donji Zovik may refer to:
 Donji Zovik (Brčko), a village in Brčko, Bosnia and Herzegovina
 Donji Zovik (Hadžići), a village in Hadžići, Bosnia and Herzegovina